Peter Thomas Anderson (born 31 May 1949) is an English former football midfielder and manager.

Club career
Anderson began his career in the Hendon F.C. Academy, turning professional with the club in 1968. In 1970, he transferred to Luton Town. His first match came on 13 February 1971 in a 1–0 victory over Watford. In December 1975, Luton Town sold Anderson to Royal Antwerp in order to prevent banckruptcy. In 1978, Anderson moved to the San Diego Sockers of the North American Soccer League. He played eleven matches, scoring six goals off two hat tricks, before a midseason transfer to the Tampa Bay Rowdies. The Rowdies advanced all the way to Soccer Bowl '78. He played in Tampa for three outdoor and two NASL indoor seasons. In the fall of 1978, he went on loan to Sheffield United, but broke his collar bone late in the English season and missed all of the 1979 NASL season, except for six playoff games and Soccer Bowl '79. The following March, Anderson scored the title-clinching goal in a mini-game tie-breaker for the Rowdies versus Memphis in the 1980 NASL Indoor Championship Finals. In 1980, Millwall hired Anderson as player-manager. In 1982, the team released him and he finished his career with Hendon before returning to live in the United States.

In 1997, he founded Bayshore Technologies in Tampa Bay.

Honors
NASL 1979–80 Indoor Championship 
Soccer Bowl '78 (runner up)
Soccer Bowl '79 (runner up)

References

External links
 Hendon F.C.: Peter Anderson
 "The PFA Premier & Football League Players' Records 1946-1998" (edited and compiled by Barry J. Hugman 1998) 
 NASL stats
 Tampa Bay Rowdies: Peter Anderson
 Bayshore Technologies

1949 births
Living people
English football managers
English footballers
English expatriate footballers
Hendon F.C. players
Luton Town F.C. players
Millwall F.C. managers
Millwall F.C. players
North American Soccer League (1968–1984) indoor players
North American Soccer League (1968–1984) players
Belgian Pro League players
Expatriate footballers in Belgium
Royal Antwerp F.C. players
San Diego Sockers (NASL) players
Sheffield United F.C. players
Tampa Bay Rowdies (1975–1993) players
Footballers from Hendon
Association football midfielders
English expatriate sportspeople in the United States
Expatriate soccer players in the United States